Saving Lives at Sea is a television documentary series about the Royal National Lifeboat Institution, showing its rescues in British coastal waters.  It was first broadcast by BBC Two on 13 July 2016.  As of 2021, there were six annual seasons with over fifty episodes and production continuing.

See also
 Coast (TV series)

References

External links
 
 Saving Lives at Sea – the production company Blast! Films
 

2010s British documentary television series
2016 British television series debuts
2020s British documentary television series
BBC Television shows
Emergency services in the United Kingdom
English-language television shows
Royal National Lifeboat Institution
Sea rescue organisations of the United Kingdom